Pelagia Mendoza y Gotianquin (1867–1939) was the first female sculptor in the Philippines and was the first female student at the Escuela de Dibujo y Pintura (Drawing and Painting School).

Biography
Born in the Pateros district of Manila on 9 June 1867, she was the daughter of Venancio Mendoza and Evarista Gotianquin. From an early age, she became interested in art, sketching landscapes, embroidering handkerchiefs and modelling figures of people and animals.Pelagia Mendoza y Gotianquin (1867–1939) was the first female sculptor in the Philippines and was the first female student at the Escuela de Dibujo y Pintura (Drawing and Painting School).
Pelagia, when 22, was the first woman admitted to the art school Escuela de Dibujo y Pintura. Lorenzo Rocha, the school's head took a personal interest in her studies. She received her diploma in painting in 1892 and in sculpture in 1898. In 1892, before she had completed her sculpture course, she won first prize in the Columbus Quadricentennial Art Contest for a wax bust of Christopher Columbus. It was awarded by Governor General Eulogio Despujol y Dusay. For her bust, Pelagia also won second prize at the 1893 World's Columbian Exposition.

She developed her painting skills, especially in landscapes, winning a number of prizes. In addition to painting and sculpture, she also took an interest in embroidery, decorating handkerchiefs and furniture covers.

In 1892, Pelagia married the silversmith Crispulo Zamora (1871–1922), a fellow student, with whom she had seven children.

References

1867 births
1939 deaths
Filipino sculptors
Filipino women artists
People from Pateros
Artists from Metro Manila